Metadrosus is a genus of true weevils (insects in the family Curculionidae). Species are found in Southern Europe (Greece, Italy).

References

External links 

 
 Metadrosus at insectoid.info

Curculionidae genera
Entiminae